The Royal Hotel is a heritage-listed former hotel and now commercial and apartment building located at 108 William Street, Bathurst, Bathurst Region, New South Wales, Australia. The property is privately owned. It was added to the New South Wales State Heritage Register on 2 April 1999.

History

Aboriginal people and colonisation
Aboriginal occupation of the Blue Mountains area dates back at least 12,000 years and appears to have intensified some 3000–4000 years ago. In pre-colonial times the area now known as Bathurst was inhabited by Aboriginal people of the Wiradjuri linguistic group. The clan associated with Bathurst occupied on a seasonal basis most of the Macquarie River area. They moved regularly in small groups but preferred the open land and used the waterways for a variety of food. There are numerous river flats where debris from recurrent camps accumulated over a long period. European settlement in this region after the first documented white expedition west of the Blue Mountains in 1813 was tentative because of apprehensions about resistance from Aboriginal people. There was some contact, witnessed by sporadic hostility and by the quantity of surviving artefacts manufactured by the Aborigines from European glass. By 1840 there was widespread dislocation of Aboriginal culture, aggravated after 1850 by the goldrush to the region.

Prior to European settlement in Australia, the Wiradjuri Aboriginal group lived in the upper Macquarie Valley. Bathurst was proclaimed a town by Governor Lachlan Macquarie on 7 May 1815, named after Lord Bathurst, Principal Secretary of State for the Colonies. Bathurst is Australia's oldest inland township.

Bathurst
Governor Macquarie chose the site of the future town of Bathurst on 7 May 1815 during his tour over the Blue Mountains, on the road already completed by convict labour supervised by William Cox. Macquarie marked out the boundaries near the depot established by surveyor George Evans and reserved a site for a government house and domain. Reluctant to open the rich Bathurst Plains to a large settlement, Macquarie authorised few grants there initially, one of the first being 1000 acres to William Lawson, one of the three European explorers who crossed the mountains in 1813. The road-maker William Cox was another early grantee but later had to move his establishment to Kelso on the non-government side of the Macquarie River.

A modest release of land in February 1818 occurred when ten men were chosen to take up 50 acre farms and 2 acre town allotments across the river from the government buildings. When corruption by government supervisor Richard Lewis and acting Commandant William Cox caused their dismissal, they were replaced by Lieutenant William Lawson who became Commandant of the settlement in 1818.

Macquarie continued to restrict Bathurst settlement and reserved all land on the south side of the Macquarie River for government buildings and stock, a situation that prevailed until 1826. In December 1819 Bathurst had a population of only 120 people in 30 houses, two thirds being in the township of Kelso on the eastern side of the river and the remainder scattered on rural landholdings nearby. The official report in 1820 numbered Bathurst settlers at 114, including only 14 women and 15 children. The government buildings comprised a brick house for the commandant, brick barracks for the military detachment and houses for the stock keeper, and log houses for the 50 convicts who worked the government farm. Never successful, the government farm was closed by Governor Darling in 1828.

Governor Darling, arriving in Sydney in 1825, promptly commenced a review of colonial administration and subsequently introduced vigorous reforms. On advice from Viscount Goderich, Darling divided colonial expenditure into two parts: one to cover civil administration, funded by New South Wales; the other for the convict system, funded by Britain.

By this time, J. McBrien and Robert Hoddle had surveyed the existing grants in the vicinity. Surveyor James Bym Richards began work on the south side of the river in 1826. But the town was apparently designed by Thomas Mitchell in 1830 and did not open until late 1833 after Richards had completed the layout of the streets with their two-road allotments. The first sales were held in 1831 before the survey was complete.

In 1832 the new Governor, Major General Sir Richard Bourke, visited Bathurst in October. He instructed the Surveyor General Major Thomas L. Mitchell to make arrangements for "opening the town of Bathurst without delay" and he in turn instructed the Assistant Surveyor at Bathurst J.B. Richards to lay out the blocks and streets. This was done in September 1833. It is believed that Major Mitchell named the streets, with George Street being named after King George III.

The Royal Hotel
The Royal is one of the oldest surviving hotels in Bathurst. The original building was constructed in the 1840s. The hotel was gradually enlarged and embellished during the latter part of the nineteenth century. This development culminated in the three storied balconied facade to William Street with its rich cast iron decoration added in the 1880s. This facade is largely retained on the two upper floors and could be seen as the ultimate aesthetic development of the building.

The land on which it was built was granted to George Kable on 7 May 1805. In October 1842 the Hotel was purchased by Nicholas Read. On Read's death in 1863 the property passed to his son Richard who in 1869 mortgaged the property to Blunden and Meyer.

The hotel was offered to let by tender in the Bathurst Free Press and Mining Journal on 4 December 1872. The tender notice indicates that at the time the Royal was a two-storey establishment with 8 parlours, 30 bedrooms, a dining/assembly hall seating 300, billiard room, kitchens and 2 stables accommodating 40 horses.

In the Bathurst Times of 25 March 1878 it was noted that "improvements" had been carried to the Royal. These included alterations and additions to the verandah and 'tastefully arranged open work screen with circular headed doorway abutting the footpath. They were apparently a great success as their effect was "not as of a mere improvement but that a new and handsome building has been erected". The hotel was still a two storeyed building.

The hotel was put up for auction by Blunden and Meyer in 1880 and was purchased by George Denny for A£5,010. It was probable that George Denny added the third level and cast iron verandahs that appear in the 1880 photograph.

Noted in the Bathurst Guide, 1893, the Royal had added its third storey and provided accommodation for 75 people. The dining room appears to have reduced in size from the 300 capacity noted in 1872 to seating for 80 people.

The present tiled facade of the ground floor was added in the 1940s. The Royal Hotel closed in the early 1960s.

In the 1980s, the National Trust of Australia (NSW) and the Bathurst community expressed concern for the future of the building. In recognition of the building's State significance and to ensure its future the Heritage Council of NSW recommended to the Minister the making of a Permanent Conservation Order. A Permanent Conservation Order was placed over the building on 7 October 1983.

The Department of Planning in conjunction with Bathurst City Council purchased the property with a view to restoring the building. A Conservation Policy was prepared by Havenhand & Mather Architects in 1985.

In 1987 the building was offered for sale through tender. The building was sold and the restoration of the building, in accordance with the Conservation Policy by Havenhand & Mather Architects, was a condition of sale. In the early 1990s the Royal Hotel was restored with funds provided by the Heritage Assistance Program. (Heritage Office files)

Description 
The Victorian verandahs and pediment added in the 1880s was in 1985 still largely intact and featured excellent cast iron posts and railings - including a personalised "R" to the shield on each bay.

The physical condition of the building was reported to be excellent as of 24 July 2000.

Heritage listing 
The Royal Hotel operated for approximately 120 years and forms a major part of the social history of Bathurst and has been a participant in or the backdrop to, many of the historical events of the city. It is also the only example of an elaborate three storey verandah hotel surviving in Bathurst and is prominently situated near the south-eastern end of King's Parade making a distinctive contribution to the townscape of the Bathurst Urban Conservation Area.

Royal Hotel was listed on the New South Wales State Heritage Register on 2 April 1999 having satisfied the following criteria.

The place is important in demonstrating the course, or pattern, of cultural or natural history in New South Wales.

The Royal Hotel has formed and played a continuous and significant role in the history of Bathurst for over 140 years.

The place is important in demonstrating aesthetic characteristics and/or a high degree of creative or technical achievement in New South Wales.

The fine Victorian verandah facade of the Royal Hotel is the last remaining example of a style once common to Bathurst. The Royal Hotel makes an important contribution to the streetscape and urban environment of Kins Parade, the heart of the urban and civic area of Bathurst.

The place has strong or special association with a particular community or cultural group in New South Wales for social, cultural or spiritual reasons.

It was the leading Bathurst hotel of the nineteenth and early twentieth century and was important in the social development of Australia's oldest inland city.

See also

References

Bibliography

Attribution

External links

New South Wales State Heritage Register
Bathurst, New South Wales
Pubs in New South Wales
Articles incorporating text from the New South Wales State Heritage Register
Commercial buildings in New South Wales